The Golden Eye is a 1948 American film directed by William Beaudine and starring Roland Winters in his fourth appearance as Charlie Chan. The film is also known as Charlie Chan in Texas (Belgian English title) and Charlie Chan in the Golden Eye (American poster title).

Plot
Manning, owner of the Golden Eye Mine in Arizona, persuades Charlie Chan to help him. To avoid alerting Manning's murderous enemies, Chan registers as a guest at a nearby dude ranch along with his number two son, Tommy, and his black servant, Birmingham Brown. There he meets San Francisco Police Lieutenant Mike Ruark, posing as drunken fellow guest "Vincent O'Brien" to investigate why the mine has suddenly become valuable.

When Chan goes to see Manning, he finds that he has supposedly fallen down a mineshaft, leaving him in a coma. While there, he is recognized by assayer Talbot Bartlett, who knows him from a previous case.

Later, Chan guesses that prospector Pete is stealing ore from the mine, and persuades him to guide him, Tommy and Birmingham to the mine through his secret passageway. However, when they arrive, Tommy and Birmingham find Pete's body.

Chan eventually surmises that much cheaper Mexican gold is being smuggled in and sold in the US at a huge profit by Driscoll and his men.

Cast
Roland Winters as Charlie Chan
Victor Sen Yung as Tommy Chan
Mantan Moreland as Birmingham Brown
Wanda McKay as Evelyn Manning
Bruce Kellogg as Talbot Bartlett
Tim Ryan as Lt. Mike Ruark, aka "Vincent O'Brien"
Evelyn Brent as Sister Teresa
Ralph Dunn as Jim Driscoll, superintendent of the Golden Eye
Lois Austin as Mrs. Margaret Driscoll
Forrest Taylor as Mr. Manning
Lee 'Lasses' White as Pete
Lee Tung Foo as Wong Fai, owner of a curio shop (not credited)
Eddie "Rochester" Anderson

External links

1948 films
1940s crime films
American black-and-white films
Charlie Chan films
Comedy mystery films
1940s English-language films
Films directed by William Beaudine
Films set in Arizona
Monogram Pictures films
Articles containing video clips
American crime films
1940s American films